Crepis rubra is a European species of flowering plant in the family Asteraceae with the common name red hawksbeard or pink hawk's-beard. It is native to the eastern Mediterranean region (Italy, Greece, Albania, North Macedonia, Croatia, Montenegro, Bulgaria, and Asia Minor) and is widely cultivated as an ornamental. It became naturalized in a small region of the United States (Marin County just north of San Francisco Bay in California).

Each plant will usually produce only one or two flower heads, each with as many as 100 pink or red ray florets but no disc florets. It grows in rocky fields and meadows.

References

External links
First Nature
Associazione Micologica e Botanica, Funghi e Fiori in Italia in Italian with photos
Greek Mountain Flora photo

rubra
Flora of Southeastern Europe
Flora of Western Asia
Plants described in 1753
Taxa named by Carl Linnaeus